Lissachatina immaculata is a species of very large, air-breathing land snail, a terrestrial pulmonate gastropod mollusk in the family Achatinidae. 

Usually grows to 12–15 cm.

Subspecies 
Subspecies within this species include:
 Lissachatina immaculata immaculata
 Lissachatina immaculata panthera
 Lissachatina immaculata mozambique
 Lissachatina immaculata two-tone

Distribution 
This species occurs in Southeastern Africa

References

 Crosse, H. (1879). Description d'un espèce nouvelle d'Achatina de Nossi-Bé. Journal de Conchyliologie 27: 340.

External links 
 Lamarck, [J.-B. M. de. (1822). Histoire naturelle des animaux sans vertèbres. Tome sixième, 2me partie. Paris: published by the Author, 232 pp]
 Férussac, A.E.J.P.F. d'Audebard de. (1819-1832). Histoire naturelle générale et particulière des mollusques terrestres et fluviatiles tant des espèces que l'on trouve aujourd'hui vivantes, que des dépouilles fossiles de celles qui n'existent plus; classés d'après les caractères essentiels que présentent ces animaux et leurs coquilles. J.-B. Bailliere, Paris.
 Pfeiffer, L. (1847). Descriptions of 38 new species of land-shells, in the collection of Hugh Cuming, Esq. Proceedings of the Zoological Society of London. 14 (166)
 Fontanilla I.K.C. (2010). Achatina (Lissachatina) fulica Bowdich: its molecular phylogeny, genetic variation in global populations, and its possible role in the spread of the rat lungworm Angiostrongylus cantonensis (Chen). PhD thesis, University of Nottingham. 634 pp.

 

Achatinidae
Gastropods described in 1822